Ádám Marosi (born 26 July 1984) is a Hungarian Modern pentathlete.

Career 
Marosi won the 2009 World Modern Pentathlon Championships in London. He also won the gold at the Modern Pentathlon World Cup 2010 held in Medway, GB. He competed in the 2012 Summer Olympics where he won the bronze medal.

References

External links
 

Hungarian male modern pentathletes
Modern pentathletes at the 2012 Summer Olympics
Modern pentathletes at the 2016 Summer Olympics
Olympic modern pentathletes of Hungary
1984 births
Living people
Olympic bronze medalists for Hungary
Olympic medalists in modern pentathlon
Medalists at the 2012 Summer Olympics
World Modern Pentathlon Championships medalists
Modern pentathletes at the 2020 Summer Olympics